Uroš Delić (born 10 August 1987) is a Montenegrin footballer.

Club career

Early career

Born in Nikšić, Uroš Delić began his career at nine years of age, in Partizan Belgrade. He played there for four years, before he moved to FK Milicionar Bogatić where he played for two years.

Rad Belgrade

In 2003, at the age of 16, Rad Belgrade signed him to their youth system. He was the captain of the youth squad that won the national championship.  In the season 2005–06 he made the debut for the senior team, and in the following years he has established himself in the squad and became one of the youngest team captains in club history.  He played with Rad six consecutive seasons.

Beerschot AC

On 22 July 2011, Delić signed for Beerschot.  In 2013, he played on loan at Eendracht Aalst.

Return to Rad
In September 2013 he returned to Rad Belgrade.

Syrianska FC
In March 2014 he continued his international career in Sweden, signing for Syrianska.
He played for Syrianska in Swedish Superettan league and was one of the most consistent players, showing a good performance in each game.

FC Koper
On 31 August 2014, Koper announced the signing of Uroš Delić from Syrianska.
He made his competitive debut on 13 September in Slovenian PrvaLiga against Rudar Velenje,
and scored his first goal for Koper on 18 October against Zavrč.

References

1987 births
Living people
Footballers from Nikšić
Association football midfielders
Serbia and Montenegro footballers
Montenegrin footballers
FK Rad players
Beerschot A.C. players
S.C. Eendracht Aalst players
Syrianska FC players
FC Koper players
AFC Eskilstuna players
FK Metalac Gornji Milanovac players
FK Borac Čačak players
FC Kyzylzhar players
Gol Gohar players
First League of Serbia and Montenegro players
Serbian SuperLiga players
Challenger Pro League players
Belgian Pro League players
Superettan players
Slovenian PrvaLiga players
Kazakhstan Premier League players
Persian Gulf Pro League players
Montenegrin expatriate footballers
Expatriate footballers in Serbia
Montenegrin expatriate sportspeople in Serbia
Expatriate footballers in Belgium
Montenegrin expatriate sportspeople in Belgium
Expatriate footballers in Sweden
Montenegrin expatriate sportspeople in Sweden
Expatriate footballers in Slovenia
Montenegrin expatriate sportspeople in Slovenia
Expatriate footballers in Kazakhstan
Montenegrin expatriate sportspeople in Kazakhstan
Expatriate footballers in Iran
Montenegrin expatriate sportspeople in Iran